Paul Burnell (born 29 September 1965) is a former Scotland international rugby union player. He was also a member of the 1990 Grand Slam Scotland team. He toured New Zealand in 1993 with the British & Irish Lions and at the time played club rugby for London Scottish.

Burnell was born in Edinburgh and educated at Reading Blue Coat School. Whilst studying in Leicester he played rugby for Stoneygate FC, he was kept in the 4th XV 'to improve his rugby education' as his captain put it.  Burnell played 13 games for Leicester Tigers between 1986 and 1988.

Burnell made his international début versus England at Twickenham on 4 February 1989 a match the sides drew 12-12. His only international try was against The  in the 1995 Rugby World Cup. He ran in from 70 yards dummying both wings and full back before crashing in under the posts in the 89–0 win. His final test match was against New Zealand at Murrayfield on 24 October 1999 in the World Cup knock-out stages having previously announced his intention to retire at the end of the tournament.

Burnell is London Scottish FC's most capped Scotland International player with 52 caps and represented Scotland at the 1991,1995,1999 World Cups while being a member of London Scottish FC. He is an inductee of the London Scottish Hall of Fame.

Formerly national sales director for waste company Biffa, Burnell joined the Waste Recycling Group (WRG) as Commercial and Industrial Director in September 2011.

Today Burnell is Chief Executive Officer of Redgrave, having joined in 2017. He works with CEOs and executive teams of leading companies across all industries, advising on their most critical leadership challenges.

References

1965 births
Living people
Scottish rugby union players
Scotland international rugby union players
British & Irish Lions rugby union players from Scotland
Rugby union players from Edinburgh
London Scottish F.C. players
Leicester Tigers players
People educated at Reading Blue Coat School
Scotland 'B' international rugby union players
Scottish Exiles (rugby union) players
Rugby union props